Cefnpennar also known as Cefn Pennar is a small rural hamlet north of the coal mining town of Mountain Ash, Rhondda Cynon Taff, in Wales. The village that has been in existence since at least 1870  is still part of the Aberdare, Rhondda Cynon Taff Parish. It is approximately 1 mile from Mountain Ash town centre and buses run daily (every 30 minutes according to DirectTransport.co.uk 2013). It has a number of streets including: Blackberry Place, Cefnpennar Road, Greenfield Terrace, Llwynbedw, The Avenue & Toncoch Terrace .

Facilities 

Cefnpennar has its own golf course named: Mountain Ash Golf Club (Welsh: Clwb Golff Aberpennar) as well as a children's playground and near opposite of which are a pair of bottle recycling banks. Much of the housing in the area are two to three bedroomed properties.

The nearest schools are Glenboi Primary School in Fernhill (1.2 km), Caegarw Primary School (1.8 km) for primary education, and Mountain Ash Comprehensive school (1 km) for secondary education.

The nearest hospital is Ysbyty Cwm Cynon just over 1 km away......

The nearest train station is Fernhill just over 1 km away.

Cefnpennar benefits from the Cefnpennar & District Welfare Association which maintains a significant presence in the area.

Geography 

The village is in the Cynon valley of the South Wales Valleys and as such the nearest river is the Cynon river with the Nant Pennar tributary running through the village. It is reported to be at least one mile above sea level  with low levels of light pollution.

It is surrounded on all sides by deciduous or mixed woodland.

External links 
Cefnpennar & District Welfare Association
Welsh Coal Mines - research the local pit history
www.geograph.co.uk : photos of Cefnpennar and surrounding area

References 

Populated places in Rhondda Cynon Taf
Mountain Ash, Rhondda Cynon Taf